Michalis Filippou (born 2 February 1951) is a Greek football manager.

References

1951 births
Living people
Greek football managers
Doxa Drama F.C. managers
Trikala F.C. managers
Kavala F.C. managers
Anagennisi Arta F.C. managers
Sportspeople from Piraeus